Northern Railway Divisional Sports Association Stadium is a multi-purposed stadium located in Allahabad, Uttar Pradesh. The stadium is a multi-purpose stadium used for different games. It is a home ground for Uttar Pradesh cricket team for domestic matches and hosted two Ranji Trophy matches in 1966 against Vidarbha cricket team and Rajasthan cricket team. 
The stadium is governed by Northern Railway Divisional Sports Associations. The stadium is owned by Northern Indian Railways.

References

External links
Cricinfo profile
Cricketarchive.com

Sports venues in Allahabad
Cricket grounds in Uttar Pradesh
Defunct cricket grounds in India
Northern Railway zone
Year of establishment missing